Lampsilis cardium is a species of freshwater mussel in the family Unionidae, the river mussels. It is known commonly as the plain pocketbook. It is widespread in eastern North America, where it is native to the Mississippi River and Great Lakes drainage systems.

Reproduction
All Unionidae are known to use the gills, fins, or skin of a host fish for nutrients during the larval glochidia stage. Lampsilis cardium accomplishes this by having the inner sides of its mantle flaps marked with longitudinal stripes, resembling a small fish of the genus Notropis. When these are attacked and ruptured by a striking predator fish, especially Micropterus coosae, the mussel larva is released into the gills of the host fish where it feeds and develops.

References

Molluscs of the United States
cardium
Bivalves described in 1820
Taxa named by Constantine Samuel Rafinesque
Taxonomy articles created by Polbot